The 1963–64 season was FC Dinamo București's 15th season in Divizia A. Dinamo realizes the first double in history. In addition to authoritarian rule in the championship, which they won for the third consecutive time, Dinamo wins the Romanian Cup, after beating Steaua Bucharest in the final. In the European Cup, Dinamo meets the multiple champions Real Madrid.

Results

Romanian Cup final

European Cup 
Preliminary round – first leg

Second leg

First round – first leg

Second leg

Squad 
Goalkeepers: Ilie Datcu (26 / 0); Iuliu Uțu (2 / 0).
Defenders: Cornel Popa (24 / 0); Ion Nunweiller (26 / 0); Dumitru Ivan (19 / 0); Constantin Ștefan (19 / 0); Ilie Constantinescu (1 / 0).
Midfielders:  Emil Petru (23 / 8); Lică Nunweiller (26 / 1); Octavian Popescu (11 / 3).
Forwards: Ion Pîrcălab (25 / 10); Iosif Varga (8 / 0); Gheorghe Ene (14 / 5); Constantin Frățilă (26 / 19); Ion Haidu (21 / 6); Aurel Unguroiu (8 / 5); Ion Țîrcovnicu (17 / 5); Radu Nunweiller (2 / 0); Vasile Gergely (3 / 0); Mircea Lucescu (2 / 0).
(league appearances and goals listed in brackets)

Manager: Traian Ionescu & Nicolae Dumitru.

Transfers 
Before the season, Dinamo bought Emil Petru and Octavian Popescu, both from Stiinta Cluj, and Ion Haidu from Steagu Rosu Braşov. Florin Halagian was transferred to Petrolul Ploiesti and Nicolae Selymes to Steagu Rosu. Mircea Lucescu has been promoted from the youth team.

References 

 www.rsssf.com
 www.romaniansoccer.ro

1963
Dinamo
Dinamo
1963